Hobby horsing is a hobby with gymnastic elements which uses hobby horses, also known as stick horses. Movement sequences similar to those in show jumping or dressage are partly simulated in courses, without real horses being used. The participants predominantly use self-made hobby horses.

The sport was introduced to a wider public through Selma Vilhunen's 2017 film Keppihevosten vallankumous (Hobbyhorse Revolution),  which won two awards at the 2017 Tampere Film Festival.

In Finland, the country of origin of the sport, an annual national championship is held in addition to regional competitions. This sport, which can be classified as a fun and trend sport, is particularly popular with girls and young women between the ages of 12 and 18 years and is gaining popularity beyond the other Scandinavian countries in other parts of Europe. 

While the hobby may be perceived more as a childish pastime by "real riders," Fred Sundwall, secretary general of the Finnish Equestrian Federation, views it positively: "We think it's just wonderful that Hobby Horsing has become a phenomenon and so popular." "It gives kids and teenagers who don't have horses a chance to interact with them outside of stables and riding schools."

A 2022 article in the British equestrian magazine Horse & Hound said that in the UK hobbyhorsing takes place occasionally as a novelty charity fundraising or Pony Club event but that "hobbyhorse competitions are probably more likely to be seen as a bit of fun at a school sports day than as a serious competition".  The sport had spread to Australia by 2016.

Hobby horses

Most hobby horses are sewn by hand. They are usually made of two halves of the head, which have an opening on the lower side, and a strip in the middle and filled with stuffing wool. The head is mounted on a stick, similar to a broom handle. Many hobby horsemen still design their hobby horses in the style of equestrian sports with elements such as snaffles, breastplates, halters, ropes and fly ears.

References

External Links
 Hobby Horse revolution by Selma Vilhunen Official trailer on Youtube

Hobbies
Horses in culture
Gymnastics
Sport in Finland
Women's sports